The 2005 Acura Classic was a women's tennis tournament played on outdoor hard courts in San Diego in the United States. It was part of Tier I of the 2005 WTA Tour. It was the 27th edition of the tournament and was held from August 26 through August 7, 2005. Mary Pierce won the singles title.

Champions

Singles

 Mary Pierce defeated  Ai Sugiyama, 6–0, 6–3
 It was Pierce's 1st title of the year and the 17th of her career.

Doubles

 Conchita Martínez /  Virginia Ruano Pascual defeated  Daniela Hantuchová /  Ai Sugiyama, 6–7(7–9), 6–1, 7–5
 It was Martínez's 2nd title of the year and the 13th of her career. It was Ruano Pascual's 5th title of the year and the 34th of her career.

External links
 ITF tournament edition details
 Tournament draws

Acura Classic
Acura Classic
Southern California Open
Acura Classic
2005 in American tennis